Antonio Giustiniani" (17 June 1663 – March 1730) was a Roman Catholic prelate who served as Roman Catholic Archbishop of Naxos (1701–1730), Bishop of Syros and Milos (1694–1701), and Vicar Apostolic of Izmir (1690–1694).

Biography
Antonio Giustiniani was born in Naxos, Greece on 17 June 1663.
On 13 January 1690, he was appointed during the papacy of Pope Alexander VIII as Vicar Apostolic of Izmir.
On 8 February 1694, he was appointed during the papacy of Pope Innocent XII as Bishop of Syros and Milos.
On 2 May 1694, he was consecrated bishop by Odoardo Cibo, Titular Patriarch of Constantinople. 
On 24 January 1701, he was appointed during the papacy of Pope Clement XI as Archbishop of Naxos.
He served as Archbishop of Naxos until his death in March 1730.

References

External links and additional sources
 (for Chronology of Bishops) 
 (for Chronology of Bishops) 

18th-century Roman Catholic bishops in the Republic of Venice
17th-century Roman Catholic archbishops in the Republic of Venice
Bishops appointed by Pope Alexander VIII
Bishops appointed by Pope Innocent XII
Bishops appointed by Pope Clement XI
1663 births
1730 deaths
Roman Catholic archbishops of Naxos